Romulo Gelbolingo Davide (born March 14, 1934 in Argao, Cebu) is a philanthropist, scientist and leader for the poor farmers of the Philippines who is a recipient of the renowned Ramon Magsaysay Award in 2012. He is a member of the Upsilon Sigma Phi. He is the older brother of Chief Justice Hilario G. Davide, Jr.

He is regarded as the father of Nematology for his discovery of nematode-trapping fungi P. lilacinus and P. oxalicum leading to creating BIOCON, the first Philippine biological pesticide against nematode pests as a substitute to chemicals. Davide studied at the University of the Philippines in Los Baños (UPLB) College of Agriculture (CA) in 1953-1957. He became a pioneer of the Farmer-Scientists RDE Training Program (FSTP), a program that trains marginal farmers to employ scientific methods in farming, and package and market their products effectively. Implemented countrywide in the Philippines, FSTP has lifted thousands of farmers from poverty to a new life of independence and affluence. He became professor emeritus of UP Los Baños specializing in Plant Pathology and Nematology at the Plant Pathology Department of the College of Agriculture.

References

Filipino philanthropists
Living people
Ramon Magsaysay Award winners